Derek Whitson (born 21 June 1989) is a Canadian ice sledge hockey player.

Whitson was born in Chatham, Ontario in 1989, with cerebral palsy. He joined the Canadian Sledge Hockey Team in 2007 after playing sledge hockey in the Windsor Ice Bullets sledge hockey program. He was a member of the Canadian sledge hockey team that won the silver medal at the 2009 World Sledge Hockey Challenge, as well as the one that competed in the 2010 Winter Paralympics. He was also a member of team who won the gold medal in the 2013 IPC Sledge Hockey World Championships in Korea. Whitson also is a player of football 7-a-side, in which he won a bronze medal at the 2007 Pan-American Games in Rio de Janeiro. He is also an avid golfer and artist, in which he has donated pieces of his art to art auctions in support of Canadian athletes.

Personal life 

Whitson moved to Medicine Hat, Alberta in 2014 where he then became engaged to Tara Chisholm who is the current coach of the Canada women's national ice sledge hockey team.

References

External links 
 
 

1989 births
Living people
Canadian sledge hockey players
Paralympic sledge hockey players of Canada
Paralympic bronze medalists for Canada
Ice sledge hockey players at the 2010 Winter Paralympics
Ice sledge hockey players at the 2014 Winter Paralympics
Medalists at the 2014 Winter Paralympics
Paralympic medalists in sledge hockey